Wilson Roziere Garrard (14 June 1899 – 2 June 1956) was a New Zealand cricketer who played first-class cricket for Auckland from 1919 to 1925 and represented New Zealand in the days before New Zealand played Test cricket.

Cricket career
Wilson Garrard made his first-class debut as Auckland's wicket-keeper in 1918–19. For the next six seasons he and Richard Rowntree shared the wicket-keeping position for Auckland, as well as both playing for New Zealand.

He made his highest score of 44 for Auckland against Wellington in 1924–25. Rowntree was unavailable for New Zealand's two matches against the touring Victorians later that season, and Garrard was selected for the second match, replacing James Condliffe. It was his last first-class match.

Although Garrard usually played as a wicket-keeper, in a senior match for the University club in Auckland in March 1919 he bowled an over with his left arm, another with his natural right arm, then a third with his left, taking a wicket in each over, for 13 runs.

Later life
Garrard gave up his first-class cricket career to concentrate on his law practice. In 1926 he moved to Rotorua and later to Cambridge in the Waikato. He represented Waikato against the touring Australians in 1927–28 and MCC in 1929–30.

In December 1928 Garrard married Molly Fortune in Rotorua. In 1938 he was elected to the Cambridge Borough Council.

See also
 List of Auckland representative cricketers

References

External links
Wilson Garrard at CricketArchive

1899 births
1956 deaths
New Zealand cricketers
Pre-1930 New Zealand representative cricketers
Auckland cricketers
University of Auckland alumni
20th-century New Zealand lawyers
Cricketers from Christchurch
Wicket-keepers